The Heirs of Uncle James (French: Les héritiers de l'oncle James) is a 1924 French silent comedy film directed by Alfred Machin and Henry Wulschleger, and starring Ginette Maddie,  Louis Monfils and Suzy Love.

Cast
 Ginette Maddie as Ginette  
 Louis Monfils as L'oncle James  
 Suzy Love 
 Madame Dempsey as Fanny la gouvernante  
 Monsieur Schey as Cousin Burgham  
 Georges Térof as Cousin Joris  
 Claude Machin
 Monsieur de Nogine as Lieutenant John Sullivan  
 Madame Giret as Cousine Burgham  
 Ginette Machin

References

Bibliography 
 James Robert Parish & Kingsley Canham. Film Directors Guide: Western Europe. Scarecrow Press, 1976.

External links 
 

1924 films
French silent feature films
1920s French-language films
Films directed by Henry Wulschleger
French black-and-white films
French comedy films
1924 comedy films
Pathé films
Silent comedy films
1920s French films